The V-Twin engine series from Subaru Industrial Power Products includes six models, with power ranges from 18 to 28 horsepower. These internal combustion engines feature a dual-cylinder design that resembles a “V”, a common and identifying feature of most V-twin engines.

Technology

Subaru’s V-Twins feature overhead valve (OHV) technology. OHV engines are known to be durable and compact in size. The OHV engine design is fairly simple and consists of a camshaft installed inside the engine block and valves are operated through lifters, pushrods and rocker arms.

Models

The engine line was first introduced with three models, with the fourth model joining in 1998. Two new engines were recently added to the V-Twin line, the 25 horsepower EH72 LP/NG and the 28 horsepower V-Twin EFI.

V-Twin Engine Models
 EH63 – 18 horsepower
 EH64 – 20.5 horsepower
 EH65 – 22 horsepower
 EH72 – 25 horsepower
 LP/NG – 25 horsepower
 EFI – 28 horsepower

Engine Applications

The engines are often used on hot pressure washers and generators, and a variety of larger construction equipment like trenchers, ride-on trowels, concrete saws and vibratory rollers. They’re also suitable for industrial and turf applications, including large riding lawnmowers.

References

Subaru engines